Jürgen Thiele (born 8 August 1959) is a German rower who competed for East Germany in the 1980 Summer Olympics.

He was born in Altenburg.

In 1980 he won the gold medal as crew member of the East German boat in the coxless fours competition.

External links
 

1959 births
Living people
Olympic rowers of East Germany
Rowers at the 1980 Summer Olympics
Olympic gold medalists for East Germany
Olympic medalists in rowing
East German male rowers
Medalists at the 1980 Summer Olympics
People from Altenburg
Sportspeople from Thuringia